Köping River (Swedish: Köpingsån) is a river in Sweden.

References

Rivers of Västmanland County
Västmanland
Norrström basin